Ernst Krieck (born July 6, 1882, in Vögisheim; died March 19, 1947, in Moosburg an der Isar) was a German teacher, writer, and professor. Along with Alfred Baeumler, Krieck was considered a leading National Socialist theoretical scientist.

Life

Before the Third Reich

Ernst Krieck was born in 1882 in Vögisheim. After his graduation from junior high school, Krieck went to a teacher’s college in Karlsruhe. In 1900 he entered the Baden elementary school service; in 1904 he was transferred to Mannheim. During his following work as an elementary school teacher, he began to criticize the dominant school system as mechanical and too bureaucratic. During this time, Krieck continued to be self-educated.

In 1910, his first literary work, Persönlichkeit und Kultur (Personality and Culture), was published. In 1917, Krieck published Die deutsche Staatsidee (The German National Idea). Then in 1920 Die Revolution der Wissenschaft (The Revolution of Science) was published, and, finally, in 1922 Philosophie der Erziehung (Philosophy of Education) was published. Philosophie der Erziehung is considered Krieck’s most important book. For his work on this book, he received an honorary doctorate from Ruprecht-Karls-Universität Heidelberg.

After four years as working as a freelance writer he was appointed to work at the Pädagogische (pedagogy i.e. Science of education) Akademie in Frankfurt am Main in 1928.

Until the end of the 1920s, he supported the traditional opinions of the liberal teaching staff which was in conflict with the school politics of the SPD (Social Democratic Party), Zentrumspartei (Central Party), and the Catholic Church. Then, he took a political turn. In 1931, he became a member of the racial minded, anti-semitic fighting union for German culture. After he had declared, “Heil auf das Dritte Reich” (“Hail to the Third Reich”) at the solstice festival in 1931, Krieck was transferred to the Pädagogische Akademie Dortmund for disciplinary reasons.

During this time, throughout the Ruhr region in Germany, Krieck acted frequently as a political speaker. On January 1, 1932, he became a member of the NSDAP (Nationalsozialistische Deutsche Arbeiterpartei or National Socialistic German Workers Party) and the National Socialistic teachers union. In 1932, due to further Nazi agitation, Krieck was suspended as professor.

Third Reich Era

After the Nazi “takeover,” due to a secretarial decree, Krieck was elected President of the Johann Wolfgang Goethe-Universität Frankfurt am Main in April 1933. He had been the only candidate. It was only a day before that he had been elected Professor of Education and Philosophy. He was the first Nazi President of a German University. After his election he declared that “the old gap between Volkstum (the people) and the University was finally bridged.” His election marked the beginning of a union “between the Führer of the town, the guidance of the NSDAP, and the Führer of the University.” He announced an aggressive cleanup of the University: “It is our collective goal, to make a stronghold for the German spirit in the city of Frankfurt. We are marching toward a new culture, that of National Socialism and its Führer to make way for the political revolution…” One of the first measures was the public burning of books on the Römerberg on May 10, 1933. 

Krieck became a professor despite the fact that he had no Abitur (a diploma from German secondary school qualifying a person for admission into a University). Krieck grew up in a working class environment-his father was a mason and a peasant-and it wasn’t possible for Krieck to attend high school. Therefore, his training as an elementary school teacher was the only possibility for him to receive a higher education. Through his absolute support of National Socialism and because of his education as a teacher, it was possible for Krieck to be appointed to higher teaching positions. He was himself unsatisfied with his résumé and incorporated his personal experience of social criticism into it.

Krieck became the publisher of the new magazine “Volk im Werden” (People Coming into Being), which was published every two months from 1933-1944 and covered Nazi ideas concerning education. Krieck published many articles in this magazine. In 1934, Krieck went to Ruprecht-Karls Universität Heidelberg and took a position as chair of the Philosophy and Education department. In the summer of 1936 he appeared with Bernhard Rust both publicly and programmatically. Starting in 1934, he also worked with the Sicherheitsdienst (Security Service) des Reichsführers SS and worked as a spy in the science section. In 1935 he became the leader of the Gau Nazi teachers' union in Baden. From April 1937 to October 1938 he was President at the University of Heidelberg. His core philosophy caused severe controversy with the NS race theorists in the years of 1936-1938, whereupon he left all party and academic offices. In 1938, he left the SS, but was then given the honorary role of SS-Obersturmbannführer. He was chairman of the Philosophy and Education department in Heidelberg until the end of World War II.

In 1944 he became one of several leaders of the National Socialist teachers' union.

After the Third Reich

After the end of World War II, he was dismissed from the University and detained by US occupying forces. He died on March 19, 1947, in an internment camp located in Moosburg an der Isar.

The Heidelberg University Archives has received estate items belonging to Ernst Krieck and his daughter, Ilse Krieck. This inheritance includes photo albums, single frame pictures, a bust, correspondence, and five gramophone records that play a speech given by Krieck in 1933.

Work

"Philosophy of Education"
Perhaps Krieck's most important work was Philosophy of Education (1922). Krieck's ideas about education, which he describes in this book, were very unusual at the time. He intended to break up the "planned influence of elders on youth [...]". The decisive factor in "proper" education was the way in which children grew up in social communities. It is more than planned education and is therefore "functional". Because it is always carried out where certain forms of community life have an effect on the child and shape it, it stands in contrast to the "intentional" approach of schools and parents. With this theory, he turned against the generally accepted ideas of the 1920s that education had to take place rationally in school and university. He designed a three-layer model in which "functional" education should take place: "The lowest layer of educational factors consists of the unconscious effects, bonds and relationships from person to person. They form the subsoil of community life, the most immediate and strongest bond in the organic structure [...]." The second layer is at the level of conscious social action, for example in the family or at the workplace. Krieck wrote: "[...] educational effects emanate from every interaction on the participants, even if these effects are neither intended nor even become conscious. In it, people become mutually educating forces. [...] When two people take part in a business or in a work, they constantly have an educative effect on each other through agreement or opposition." Simplified, the principle of "all educate all" can be derived from this. Only in the third layer does a rationally organised education take place, which is based on concrete intentions, methods and purposes. All three layers are of equal importance and dependent on each other. Basically, all social and societal life has an educational implication. Here we encounter an essential concept of Krieck's educational theory, namely that of "community". Since every human being is a member of communities, he is also educated according to the respective type expectation and in turn contributes to the education of others. The highest form of community is the "people", to which everyone is a member. In this context, Krieck distinguishes four forms of mutual "external education":
The community educates the members.
The members educate each other.
The members educate the community.
The community educates the community.

It must be said that Krieck does not recognise every unit as a community. To explain these forms of education, Giesecke chooses the example of the family: the family as a community educates its members, e.g. the children. They educate each other and, through their ideas, also the family as a community. The communities educate other communities, e.g. neighbouring families. Furthermore, two forms of "self-education" are described:
The community educates itself. 
The individual educates himself.

What remains unanswered is the question of how communities can educate themselves if this does not happen at least through the initiative of their members. Individual "self-education" refers to the effort that individuals make by obtaining their own version from the different educational demands and trying to fulfil them.
For Krieck, "breeding" takes the place of actual education. It is a process of collective integration of the human being. What is meant here is the shaping of an individual within a community through fixed values and a standardised course of evolution. The goal is the development into a fixed "type". Only the individual who conforms to the "type" becomes a "full member" of the community and is the result of the forming and breeding process.

"National-Political Education"
Krieck joined the NS Teachers' Association on 1 January 1932. His ideas on educational science became particularly clear in the work "Nationalpolitische Erziehung" (National Political Education), published that same year. In it, Krieck called for a "politicisation" of the sciences. Due to Germany's current plight, all efforts must now be directed towards presenting productive perspectives. The introduction to this treatise says: "The age of 'pure reason', of 'presuppositionless' and 'value-free' science is over." Krieck sees "political opponents" primarily among supporters of liberalism, individualism and pacifism. The new bearer of "political" science was the National Socialist movement itself. If in his previous works he demanded that educational science describe the educational effect on the community, he now explains the educational significance of the Nazi mass movement.

The community should again be ordered in such a way that the "people" once again appears as an "organic" totality and the individual members see themselves as "members". As a "disciplinarian", the state was to bring the whole people to consciously participate in this task. Here, a basic intention of National Socialist ideology becomes clear, which the "movement" sees as being realised only through the transformed education of youth. Furthermore, the emancipation of women is condemned. The woman belonged in the family and had no place in public life. "The political Amazon, the symbol of feminine ages" appears as a "caricature of manhood and womanhood at the same time".

In the second part of his "Nationalpolitische Erziehung", Krieck develops a concept of school and education as a counter-proposal to reform pedagogy. Both are subject to a need for reform that can only be initiated by the "völkisch" community. For Krieck, school continues not to be a place where values, norms and goals are taught, but rather: "The principle of the völkisch school reform is: to integrate, to incorporate on all sides, so that education can grow out of the organic bond".

Another essential aspect of his work is the concept of "race", which is glorified as a mythical symbol: "Race manifests itself as an order of life, a power that permeates attitude, direction of will and history, which reveals itself out of instinct, the feeling for life [...] and thus [...] elevates itself to a task". The term must always be linked to the political objective and is defined by the ruling class. It serves the education and upbringing of the new human being: "Out of the general mixture and emasculation of the liberal age, a racially strong humanity is selected and bred up as the backbone of the nascent people and the supporting layer of the overall national state." For Krieck, the Führer principle seems to be the guarantee for compensating for any unavoidable tensions that might arise as a result of the upheaval. Only this dogma could hold the movement together in such a case.

According to Giesecke,  the commercial success of this book - 80,000 copies were sold by 1941 - can be explained on the one hand by the fact that Krieck's sharp criticism of the Weimar Republic expressed in it met with a broad response among the German population; on the other hand, people attached their hopes for an improvement of the general situation to the Nazi movement. Nevertheless, Krieck owed many explanations for his lines of thought. The call for fundamental transformations in education is not based on any solutions. He sees the answers in the National Socialist movement. For this "[...] has thus developed the elementary means and methods of mass excitation and mass movement, brought into use by the instincts of its leaders, into a general form of breeding, a system of training, which in the whole people [...] develops race consciousness to the highest degree [...]." In contrast to his "Philosophy of Education", this work had unmistakable features of a political pamphlet.

"Folkish-Political Anthropology"

Krieck's magnum opus was "Folkish-Political Anthropology", which was published in 3 volumes from 1936 to 1938. The three volumes were entitled, respectively, "Reality, "Actions and Orders", and "Cognition and Science". In this work, Krieck presented the ideas developed in his previous works in a more systematic form.

"Salvation and Power"

He described his attitude to religion in 1943 in the book Heil und Kraft (Salvation and Power): "Every kind of religion originates in Asia; religion is alien to us in terms of kind and meaning. It belongs to the realm of self-deifying illusionism. For us Germans, the living faith in God and destiny, which gives birth to the will and shapes the living reality of the world as a creative force by creating history and determining the image of nature, is in keeping with our nature and purpose. Faith gives birth to will and power, religion destroys will and power; religion is hostile to the life of our race. Faith, will and power are the powers of health; religion with magic, underworld and redemption is the cause of disease. Faith, power and will come from the God-sent salvation, from vocation, endowment, grace and work health of life."

Works
Heil und Kraft: Ein Buch Germanischer Weltweisheit. Leipzig: Armanen-Verlag, 1943. 
Erlebter Neuidealismus. Heidelberg: Carl Winter's Universitätsbuchhandlung, 1942. 
Natur und Naturwissenschaft. Leipzig: Oswald Schmidt, 1941
Der Mensch in der Geschichte. Leipzig: Armanen-Verlag, 1940
England: Ideologie und Wirklichkeit. München: Zentralverlag der NSDAP, 1940.
Volkscharakter und Sendungsbewußtsein. Politische Ethik des Reichs. Leipzig: Armanen, 1940.
Weltanschauliche Entscheidung. Leipzig: Österreichischer Landesverlag, 1939.
Mythologie des bürgerlichen Zeitalters. Leipzig: Armanen-Verlag, 1939.
Leben als Prinzip der Weltanschauung und Problem der Wissenschaft. Leipzig: Armanen-Verlag, 1938.   
Völkisch-Politische Anthropologie. 3 Bände. Leipzig: Armanen-Verlag, 1936-1938. 
Nationalpolitische Erziehung. 20. Auflage. Leipzig: Armanen-Verlag, 1936. 
Grundriß der Erziehungswissenschaft. Fünf Vorträge. Leipzig: Quelle & Meyer, 1936.
Wissenschaft, Weltanschauung, Hochschulreform. Leipzig: Armanen-Verlag, 1934.
Der Staat des Deutschen Menschen. 2. Auflage. Berlin: Junker und Dünnhaupt Verlag, 1933. 
Musische Erziehung. 1933. 
Volk im Werden. Leipzig: Gerhard Stalling, 1932. 
Völkischer Gesamtstaat und nationale Erziehung. Heidelberg: Bündischer Verlag, 1932. 
Erziehungsphilosophie. München, 1930. 
Geschichte der Bildung. München, 1930. 
Staat und Kultur. Frankfurt am Main, 1929. 
Deutsche Kulturpolitik?. Frankfurt am Main, 1928. 
Bildungssysteme der Kulturvölker. Leipzig, 1927. 
Menschenformung: Grundzüge der vergleichenden Erziehungswissenschaft. Leipzig: Quelle & Meyer, 1925. 
Philosophie der Erziehung. Jena: Eugen Diederichs Verlag, 1922. 
Erziehung und Entwicklung. Vorspiele zur autonomen Pädagogik. Karlsruhe, 1921. 
Die Revolution der Wissenschaft. Karlsruhe, 1921. 
Die deutsche Staatsidee. Ihre Geburt aus dem Erziehungs- und Entwicklungsgedanken. Jena, 1917. 
Persönlichkeit und Kultur. Heidelberg: Carl Winter's Universitätsbuchhandlung, 1910.

References

External links

 Volk im Werden, B1133, digitized volumes of the periodical 1939-1940 at the Leo Baeck Institute, New York 

1882 births
1947 deaths
German educational theorists
Academic staff of Goethe University Frankfurt
SS-Obersturmbannführer